Ahmed Hill (born March 21, 1995) is an American professional basketball player for Medi Bayreuth of the Basketball Bundesliga. He played college basketball for the Virginia Tech Hokies.

College career
Hill was born in Fort Valley, Georgia and came to Virginia Tech from Aquinas High School in Augusta, Georgia. He originally committed to Marquette, but chose to follow coach Buzz Williams when he moved to the Hokies. After starting as a freshman, Hill suffered an offseason knee injury and missed the 2015–16 season. Hill returned to action after his redshirt year and started the majority of his last three seasons. He had his most productive season as a senior, averaging 13.1 points and 3.9 rebounds per game.

Professional career
Following the close of his college career, Hill played in the 2019 Portsmouth Invitational Tournament to gain exposure to professional scouts. Though he was not selected in the 2019 NBA draft, Hill signed a two-way contract with the Charlotte Hornets of the National Basketball Association (NBA). The Hornets waived Hill on October 19, 2019. He then signed with the Northern Arizona Suns of the NBA G League.

For the 2020–21 season, Hill joined the Greensboro Swarm of the G League. In 11 games, he averaged 4.2 points, 2.1 rebounds and 1.4 assists in 14.7 minutes. On March 26, he signed with the Guelph Nighthawks of the CEBL. Hill averaged 16.8 points and 2.3 assists per game for the Nighthawks. On December 6, 2021, he has signed with HydroTruck Radom of the Polish Basketball League.

In May 2022, Hill was reacquired by the Guelph Nighthawks.

On August 5, 2022, he has signed with Medi Bayreuth of the Basketball Bundesliga.

References

External links
Virginia Tech Hokies bio
College stats @ sports-reference.com

1995 births
Living people
American expatriate basketball people in Canada
American expatriate basketball people in Germany
American expatriate basketball people in Poland
American men's basketball players
Basketball players from Augusta, Georgia
Greensboro Swarm players
Guelph Nighthawks players
Medi Bayreuth players
Northern Arizona Suns players
People from Fort Valley, Georgia
Shooting guards
Virginia Tech Hokies men's basketball players